The Pastoral Neolithic (5000 BP - 1200 BP) refers to a period in Africa's prehistory, specifically Tanzania and Kenya, marking the beginning of food production, livestock domestication, and pottery use in the region following the Later Stone Age. The exact dates of this time period remain inexact, but early Pastoral Neolithic sites support the beginning of herding by 5000 BP. In contrast to the Neolithic in other parts of the world, which saw the development of farming societies, the first form of African food production was nomadic pastoralism, or ways of life centered on the herding and management of livestock. The shift from hunting to food production relied on livestock that had been domesticated outside of East Africa, especially North Africa. This period marks the emergence of the forms of pastoralism that are still present. The reliance on livestock herding marks the deviation from hunting-gathering but precedes major agricultural development. The exact movement tendencies of Neolithic pastoralists are not completely understood.

The term "Pastoral Neolithic" is used most often by archaeologists to describe early pastoralist periods in eastern Africa (also known as the "East African Neolithic"). In the Sahara, hunter-gatherers first adopted livestock (e.g., cattle, sheep, goats) in the eighth to seventh millennia BP. As the grasslands of the Green Sahara began drying out in the mid-Holocene, herders then spread into the Nile Valley and eastern Africa. 

During the Pastoral Neolithic in eastern Africa (5000 BP - 1200 BP), archaeologists have identified two pastoralist groups who spread through southern Kenya and Northern Tanzania; they co-existed alongside Eburran phase 5 hunter-gatherers; these groups are known as the Savanna Pastoral Neolithic and the Elmenteitan. The Pastoral Neolithic in eastern Africa was followed by the Pastoral Iron Age approximately two thousand years ago, during which agriculture, iron technology, and Bantu speakers spread into the region.

Origins 

The beginning of the Pastoral Neolithic follows the Late Stone Age around 5000 BP. The earliest instances of food production in East Africa are found in Kenya and Tanzania. The earliest Pastoral Neolithic sites are in the Lake Turkana region from around 5000 BP. Predating the introduction of imported livestock, African pastoralists kept domestic livestock but did not keep the lifestyles characteristic of modern pastoralists; this is shown by the lack of bones from domesticated animals and an abundance of bones from undomesticated animals at early Pastoral Neolithic sites. These preliminary herding cultures are characteristic of the Pastoral Neolithic and generally lack stationary agricultural practices and metal use. The exact introductory timeline of pastoralism to eastern Africa is not completely known.

The faunal record shows that the livestock of Neolithic pastoralists were not domesticated in East Africa, but were introduced into East Africa; faunal remains of wild cattle, sheep, or goats are not found. The fossils of common domesticates are not found at excavated sites in East Africa (e.g., Lake Turkana Basin, Lake Nakuru Basin, Serengeti Plains, Lake Eyasi), suggesting they were not present during the transition into the Pastoral Neolithic. Limited cave painting evidence from Mt. Elgon, Kenya is consistent with the presence of northern African breeds of cattle during the Pastoral Neolithic. These domesticated animals can be estimated to have arrived in northern Africa around 8000 BP and to have reached Eastern Africa by 5000 BP. The import of different breeds of cattle occurred on multiple different occasions throughout the Pastoral Neolithic period. 

Genetic evidence shows that lactase persistence developed in East African populations between 7000 BP and 3000 BP, which is consistent with existing evidence for the introduction of livestock.

Migratory patterns 
The exact way in which pastoralism reached East Africa during the Pastoral Neolithic is not completely understood. The pottery and stone tools found near Lake Turkana supports that migrants from Ethiopia and Sudan traveled south in small bursts and introduced pastoralism.

A considerable amount of evidence supports the case of there being two major expansions (associated with the spread of Afro-Asiatic and Nilo-Saharan languages) in eastern Africa which transformed the food systems of the region.

Using DNA extracted from skeletal remains at Later Stone Age, Pastoral Neolithic, and sites in Kenya and Tanzania, a study by Prendergast et al. (2019) concludes that modern Afro-Asiatic speakers are ancestrally connected with groups who lived during the Pastoral Neolithic. Afro-Asiatic languages are spoken by modern groups in North Africa, the Horn of Africa, and the Middle East.

A recent study published in Nature journal  analyzed a sample from Kadruka, Upper Nubia dated to roughly 2000BCE and found it to be genetically indistinguishable from those of the Pastoral Neolithic. The authors of the study, then, theorize that the Pastoral Neolithic likely arose through a rapid migration from the Nile Valley, without significant admixture with the indigenous foragers of East Africa as was previously thought.

Cultural characteristics 
Neolithic pastoralists employed various subsistence strategies (e.g., fishing, herding) and are generally associated with stone tools, ceramics, and burial traditions.

Pastoral practices 
The shift from hunting-gathering to herding developed gradually, over thousands of years, during the Pastoral Neolithic. The Pastoral Neolithic of East Africa is one of a few in world history where herding significantly preceded agricultural food production.

The major transition from predominantly hunter-gatherer economies to predominantly herding economies may have occurred around 3000 BP. There are limited remains of domesticated animals at sites that predate 3000 BP. For example, at the Enkapune Ya Muto rock shelter site of central Kenya, among evidence of mostly wild fauna, there are few caprine (goat/sheep) teeth dated to around 4400 BP. The length of time between the initial introduction of domesticates and their full adoption is thought to have occurred between the cultural separation of immigrant populations and indigenous populations in the region. Additionally, paleoclimatic evidence from Lake Naivasha, Kenya suggests that rain patterns may not have been favorable for dairy pastoralism until around 3000 BP. After 3000 BP, the majority of fauna found at Pastoral Neolithic sites are from domesticated animals rather than undomesticated animals. By this time, many communities were exclusively stock-keeping and herding.

Stone tool use 

As compared to stone use associated with agriculture, archeological reports of stone use provide insight into the technological development and use during the Pastoral Neolithic.

The major 20th century archeological study of Stone Bowl cultures conducted by Louis Leakey and Mary Leakey uncovered a considerable amount of evidence about food systems during the Pastoral Neolithic.

The archeological site at Luxmanda, Tanzania is estimated to have been occupied initially around 3000 BP, thereby, establishing it as Africa's southernmost Pastoral Neolithic site to date. The size of stone tools found at Luxmanda establishes that Pastoral Neolithic establishments may not have been mobile. Stones were used for the purpose of grinding show high plant food processing as well as for the purpose of bone marrow pounding and grease extractions. These stone tools found at Luxmanda, Tanzania challenge established ideas about travel patterns and food systems during the Pastoral Neolithic.

Archeological evidence from the Lake Turkana region shows that Nderit and Ileret pottery emerged in the region between 4500 BP and 4200 BP. The introduction of these distinct decorated and shaped forms of pottery are associated with sheep and cattle domestication in the region.

Burial traditions 

Excavations of cemeteries and burial sites of communities during the Pastoral Neolithic provide insight into the traditions and social structures associated with the Pastoral Neolithic.

The Lothagam North Pillar Site is a communal cemetery in the Lake Turkana region where the earliest Pastoral Neolithic sites are found. The Lothagam North Pillar Site consists of a large cavity constructed with large rocks, estimated to hold at least 580 individuals. The demographics of those buried are diverse in age, sex, and predicted social class. This site is consistent with the narrative of communities in movement throughout the Pastoral Neolithic.

The end of the Pastoral Neolithic 
The introduction of metallurgy around 1200 BP marks the end of the Pastoral Neolithic. The iron-using pastoralists of the Early Iron Age consists populations that descend from Pastoral Neolithic populations, immigrating populations from Northern Africa, and populations from elsewhere. The Pastoral Neolithic period is followed by the Pastoral Iron Age and Iron Age.

References 

Prehistoric Africa
Stone Age Africa
Neolithic